A Gompa or Gönpa ( "remote place", Sanskrit araṇya), also known as ling, is a Buddhist ecclesiastical fortification of learning, lineage and sādhanā that may be understood as a conflation of a fortification, a vihara and a university associated with Tibetan Buddhism and thus common in historical Tibetan regions including parts of China, India, Nepal, and Bhutan. Bhutanese dzong architecture is a subset of traditional gompa design.

Gompa may also refer to a meditation room, without the attached living quarters, where practitioners meditate and listen to teachings. Meditation rooms in urban Buddhist centres are often referred to as gompas.

Design and interior details vary from region to region; however, all follow a general design of a central prayer hall containing a murti or thangka, benches for the monks or nuns to engage in prayer or meditation and attached living accommodation. The gompa or ling may also be accompanied by any number of stupas.

For practical purposes 'Gompa' is an imprecise term used by westerners traveling in Tibetan regions to refer to a variety of religious buildings, generally correlating to what might be described as a church but including small temple buildings and other places of worship or religious learning.

References

External links
Article on Likir & Alchi Gompa by Rangan Datta
Article on Tashiding Gompa, Sikkim by Rangan Datta
 Travel Article on Gompas of West Sikkim by Rangan Datta
Rangan Datta's Home Page
WanderingScapes: A traveler's account of Ladakh and its Gompas

Tibetan Buddhist architecture
Buddhist temples
Buddhist monasteries